Predator 2: Original Motion Picture Soundtrack is the official soundtrack album of the 1990 science fiction film Predator 2. It was composed and conducted by Alan Silvestri. The score is orchestral whilst also mixing traditional African instruments and was released on December 13, 1990 via Varèse Sarabande label.

Track listing
 "Main Title" – 2:46
 "First Carnage" – 2:34
 "Tunnel Chase" – 4:53 (note: this track is similar to the score of the Back to the Future trilogy, more precisely to the tracks "Doc Returns" of the first chapter and the intro theme, always of the first chapter)
 "Truly Dead" – 4:58
 "Danny Gets It" – 3:18
 "Rest In Pieces" – 1:35
 "El Scorpio" – 2:42
 "This Is History" – 6:28
 "Swinging Rude Boys" – 2:40
 "Dem Bones" – 4:28
 "End Title" – 8:46

The Deluxe Edition
Varese Sarabande issued a greatly expanded version on December 1, 2014.

Disc 1

 Welcome to the Jungle (2:52)  
 Chat (2:02) 
 Up On the Roof (3:27)
 First Carnage (2:35)  
 Feds On the Case (:44)
 Swinging Rude Boys (5:33)
 Last Person/Danny Gets It (4:30) 
 Stay Out of My Way (:31)
 Mystery Dart (1:32)
 Truly Dead (5:25)  
 Kid Commando (:34)
 Rest In Pieces (1:36)  
 Subway Predator (5:22)
 Tunnel Chase (5:17)  
 This Is History (7:11)

Disc 2

 Meat Locker (3:29)  
 Ugly Mother (3:40)  
 Birds (2:33)
 The Doctor (3:44)  
 Elevator Shaft (1:45)  
 Dem Bones (4:29)
 More Than One (2:34) 
 Came So Close/End Credits (9:08) 
 Hardcore Logo (1:26)
 Danny Gets It (Extended Album Mix) (4:29)
 Tunnel Chase (Extended Album Mix) (4:20)  
 This Is History (Extended Album Mix) (5:17)
 Dem Bones (Album Mix) (6:40)  
 Wild Predator Voices (2:11)

Credits
Composed By, Conductor, Producer – Alan Silvestri 
Contractor [Orchestra] – Greg Sudmeier, Jeff Beal 
Edited By [Assistant Music Editor] – Jacqueline Tager 
Edited By [Music] – Ken Karman 
Engineer [Assistant] – M.T. Silvia, Tony Eckert 
Engineer [Consulting] – Bob Edwards 
Executive Producer – Robert Townson 
Orchestrated By – James B. Campbell 
Other [Executive Assistant] – Tom Null 
Performer – The Skywalker Symphony Orchestra 
Producer [Assistant To] – David Bifano 
Recorded By, Mixed By – Dennis Sands
℗ © 1990 Twentieth Century Fox

References

1990s film soundtrack albums
1990 soundtrack albums
Varèse Sarabande soundtracks
Alan Silvestri soundtracks
Predator (franchise)